Isabel Steva i Hernández, whose pseudonym is Colita (born 24 August 1940, Barcelona), is a Spanish photographer. She trained with Xavier Miserachs i Ribalta, and began her professional career in 1961 as a lab technician and stylist for Miserachs.

Initially, she demonstrated great interest in dance photography—almost always flamenco music—and later she also specialized in portraits and journalistic photography. She has had numerous exhibitions with photographs of Catalan artists and singers from the Nova Cançó era to the present. She has published many books.

Biography 
Colita is one of the most important Catalan and Spanish photographers of the last quarter of the twentieth century. She began in the world of photography with Xavier Miserachs, for whom she worked as an assistant. During these early years, she was a follower and disciple of Francesc Català Roca and Julio Ubiña. From 1963-75, she focused on creating a series of portraits of Flamenco dancers and singers. As she is linked with the Catalan cultural movements of the era, she is considered the official photographer of Barcelona's Gauche Divine, a movement of writers, photographers, models, architects, film directors, and many other professionals who began to stand out in that area in their respective fields.

She created a series of projects between 1967 and 1979, at the Escola de Cine [Film School] of Barcelona, with directors such as Vicente Aranda and Jaime Camino, who belonged to a film movement born with the idea of creating European, progressive movies in contrast with the official cinematography of the francoist regime. She collaborated in the promotion of the Nova Cançó, making portraits of the singers in the movement, including Joan Manuel Serrat.

Colita's work in the press has been published in magazines such as Siglo XX, Destino, Fotogramas, Interviú, Boccaccio, Primera Plana and Mundo Diario.

Throughout her career, Colita has put on more than forty exhibitions and has published some fifty books of photographs. Stylistically, she is closer to the ideas of the Barcelona School, although she is considered an all-purpose photographer. Her work is part of the collections of the Museu Nacional d'Art de Catalunya.

Selected works 
 Guia secreta de Barcelona (Secret Guide to Barcelona) (1974)
 Els cementiris de Barcelona (Barcelona's cemeteries) (1982) 
 L'eixample de Barcelona (1982) (Barcelona's Example Neighborhood) in collaboration with Pilar Aymerich i Puig

Important exhibitions 
 1979: Espai 13 (Fundació Joan Miró) A rose is a rose, is a rose, is a rose, with Xavier Olivé
 2014: Casa Milà, Colita perquè sí

Prizes and accolades 
 1998: Artistic Merit Prize from the Ajuntament de Barcelona
 2004: Creu de Sant Jordi (Sant Jordi Cross) from the Generalitat de Catalunya
 2013: Premio Nacional de Fotografía Piedad Isla (National Photography Prize of Piedad Isla), awarded by the Diputació de Palencia
 2008: Premi FAD Sebastià Gasch d'Arts Parateatrals (Sebastià Gasch FAD Prize for Paratheater Arts)
 2009: Premi 1er. de Maig Joan Reventós a la memòria popular (Joan Reventós May 1 Prize for Popular Culture, Fundació Rafael Campalans
 2009: Premi a la comunicació no sexista i a la trajectòria periodística (Non-sexist communication and journalist career prizes). Associació de Dones Periodistes de Catalunya (Women Journalists Association of Catalonia)
 2011: Premi Internacional Terenci Moix (Terenci Moix International Prize), premi especial del jurat (Special jury prize)
 2012: Honoris Causa, Universitat Autònoma de Barcelona.

Colita Collection 
Her work from 1962 to 2002 is conserved at the Museu de les Arts Escèniques (Museum of Performing Arts) of Barcelona. It contains 900 negatives and contact sheets, approximately 32,000 photographs of shows, portraits of artists and celebrities related to the performing arts, and related events. Her collection is registered and catalogued in an internal data base and is not accessible via the internet.

A part of her collection is also conserved in the National Archive of Catalonia. The collection comprises the portraits that Colita has made throughout her career as a professional photographer. It is the result of her collaboration with various magazines, of assignments made by the subjects themselves, or simply, for the friendship she shared with them.

Among the great collection of personalities portrayed, we can highlight, among others, those dedicated to musicians and singers. Some of these portraits came out of special assignments. It's also important to point out the photographs taken, mostly in the seventies, of the members of the Barcelona "Gauche Divine" movement. In addition to the portraits, Colita's collection also contains a series of journalistic photographs covering the social movements of the time. For example, the sit-in at  Montserrat, the attack against the Enlace bookstore, the self-mutilations of the COPEL (Spanish inmates group), Catalonia's National Day of September 11, 1978, the ceremony and acts arounds Franco's death in Madrid, the burial of the President of the Generalitat de Catalunya, Josep Tarrardellas, and various events of the Socialist Party of Catalonia that took place during the eighties.

Another part of her personal collection is conserved in the Arxiu Fotogràfic de Barcelona (Barcelona Photography Archive). This part of her collection includes Colita's photography from the sixties to the nineties. It contains black and white negatives that represent the Nova Cançó musical movement, color photographs that portray community festivals throughout Catalonia, cultural personalities and celebrities and the evolution of architecture in the city of Barcelona. One of the highlights in this material is a good deal of Colita's photographic production on the world of flamenco.

Finally, a collection of 6,987 photographs that correspond to movies, actors, film shootings, and studio portraits is conserved in the Filmoteca de Catalunya (Catalonia Film Archive), including images from shooting Dante no es unicamente severo (Jacinto Esteva, 1968), Los Tarantos (Francesc Rovira-Beleta, 1963), and Tatuaje (Bigas Luna, 1976). A selection of these images is available in the Filmoteca de Catalunya's digital archive.

Legacy 
In a popular referendum in Palafrugell in March, 2010, Colita was chosen as a woman who deserves to have a street named after her.

References

External links 
 Official web site

Photographers from Catalonia
1940 births
Living people
20th-century Spanish women artists
Spanish women photographers